John Oliver Feetham (28 January 1873 – 14 September 1947) was a long-serving Anglican bishop in Australia, who was aligned with the Anglo-Catholic tradition. He was the Anglican Bishop of North Queensland from 1913 until his death in 1947.

Early life 
Feetham was born into an ecclesiastical family, his father was the Reverend William Feetham, Rural Dean of Raglan, Monmouthshire and his mother the daughter of an archdeacon. He was educated at Marlborough College and Trinity Hall, Cambridge.

Religious life 
Feetham was ordained in 1899. After a curacy at St Simon Zelotes, Bethnal Green, he was Principal of the Brotherhood of the Good Shepherd (one of the Australian Bush Brotherhoods). In 1913 he was ordained to the episcopate as the fourth Bishop of North Queensland.

Feetham established a number of Anglican schools in North Queensland:

 All Souls and St Gabriel's in Charters Towers
 St Anne's in Townsville (now the Cathedral School)
 St Mary's School in Herberton

Later life 
Feetham died on 14 September 1947 and his ashes were interred beneath the high altar at St James' Cathedral, Townsville.

Feetham is commemorated in the Australian Anglican calendar on 15 September.

References 

1873 births
People from Cheshire
People educated at Marlborough College
Alumni of Trinity Hall, Cambridge
Anglo-Catholic bishops
Anglican bishops of North Queensland
1947 deaths
Australian Anglo-Catholics
British Anglo-Catholics
Bush Brotherhood priests